Rayagada is a village and Community Development Block in the Gajapati District of Odisha state in India. The Block comes under the administrative control of Rayagada Police station.
The Block had a population of 99,568 in 2020 census.
Mohana (Odisha Vidhan Sabha constituency) (Sl. No.: 136) is its Vidhan Sabha constituency. This constituency includes Mohana block, R.Udayagiri block, Nuagada block and Rayagada block.

References

Villages in Gajapati district